Enrico Clementi (November 19, 1931 in Cembra, Italy  - March 30, 2021) was an Italian chemist, a pioneer in computational techniques for quantum chemistry and molecular dynamics.

Dr. Clementi  received his Ph.D. in Chemistry from University of Pavia, where he was a student in the Collegio Cairoli, in 1954 and joined IBM Research in 1961. At IBM he was first responsible for atomic calculations, then manager of a scientific computation department until 1974. As an IBM Fellow (elected 1969), he led research and development in parallel computer architecture and fundamental research in chemistry, biophysics and fluid dynamics. In 1991 he retired from IBM to join Université Louis Pasteur in Strasbourg, France as Professor of Chemistry from 1992 until 2000.
Dr Clementi's work has been recognized by awards and honours: IBM Fellow (1969), Fellow of the American Physical Society (1984), President of the International Society of Quantum Biology, Alexander von Humboldt award (2001), Member of the International Academy of Quantum Molecular Science.

Selected publications
E. Clementi, "Tables of Atomic Functions",  IBM Journal of Research and Development, Special Supplement, Vol. 9, No. 1, 1965 

E. Clementi, C. Roetti, of "Tables of Roothaan-Hartree-Fock Wavefunctions", Special Issue in Atomic Data and Nuclear Data Table, Academic Press, New York, 1974

Books 
 Enrico Clementi: "Tables of atomic functions", International Business Machines Corp (1965).
 Enrico Clementi, Carla Roetti:"Atomic Data and Nuclear Data Tables",Academic Press, 1st ed.(1974).
 Enrico Clementi: "Roothaan-Hartree-Fock atomic wavefunctions: Basic functions and their coefficients for ground and certain excited states of neutral and ionized atoms, Z<54", Academic Press (1974).
 Enrico Clementi:"Determination of Liquid Water Structure: Coordination Numbers for Ions and Solvation for biological Molecules",(Lecture Notes in Chemistry 2),Springer-Verlag, (1976).
 Enrico Clementi: "Computational Aspects for Large Chemical Systems", Lecture Notes in Chemistry No.19, Springer-Verlag(1980). 
 Enrico Clementi (Ed.), Ramaswamy H. Sarma (Ed.):"Structure and Dynamics: Nucleic Acids and Proteins; Lajolla Symposium Proce Edings, 1982", Proceedings of International Symposium on Structure and Dynamics of Nucleic Acids and Protei",Adenine Pr, (1983).
 Enrico Clementi: "Biological and Artificial Intelligence Systems",Springer; 1st ed.,  (Sep. 30th, 1988).
 E. Clementi (Ed.): "Modern Techniques in Computational Chemistry: MOTECC-89",Springer,  (1989).
 E. Clementi (Ed.): "Modern Techniques in Computational Chemistry: MOTECC-90",Springer, (1990).
 E. Clementi (Ed.): "Modern Techniques in Computational Chemistry: MOTECC-91",Springer,  (1991).
 Enrico Clementi (Ed.):"Methods and Techniques in Computational Chemistry: METECC-94, Volume C: Structure and Dynamics",STEF,  (1993).
 Enrico Clementi (Ed.), Giorgina Corongiu (Ed.):"Methods and Techniques in Computational Chemistry: METECC-95", STEF, Cagliari,  (1995).
 Jean-Marie Andre, David H. Mosley, Marie-Claude Andre, Benoit Champagne, Enrico Clementi, Joseph G. Fripiat, Laurence Leherte, Lorenzo Pisani, Daniel P. Vercauteren, Marjan Vracko :"Exploring Aspects of Computational Chemistry", (in French),Presses Universitaires De Namur,  (1997).
 Enrico Clementi (Ed.), Jean-Marie André (Ed.), J. Andrew McCammon (Ed.):"Theory and Applications in Computational Chemistry: The First Decade of the Second Millennium:: International Congress TACC-2012 (AIP Conference Proceedings)", American Institute of Physics, (Aug. 29th, 2012).

References

External links 
 Bio at IAQMS
 Computer del futuro. Conversazione con Enrico Clementi  (Interview Movie. 1987 at IBM Kingston)
 Enrico Clementi: Produced by Quantum Theory Project Dept. Chem. and Phys. Univ. Florida

1931 births
2021 deaths
People from Trentino
IBM Fellows
Members of the International Academy of Quantum Molecular Science
Theoretical chemists
Italian chemists
Computational chemists
Fellows of the American Physical Society